Denev is a Bulgarian masculine surname, its feminine counterpart is Deneva. Notable people with the surname include:

Dencho Denev (born 1936), Bulgarian sports shooter
Georgi Denev (born 1950), Bulgarian football player and manager 

Bulgarian-language surnames